Favrile glass is a type of  iridescent art glass developed by Louis Comfort Tiffany. He patented this process in 1894 and first produced the glass for manufacture in 1896 in Queens, New York. It differs from most iridescent glasses because the color is ingrained in the glass itself, as well as having distinctive coloring. Tiffany won a grand prize at the 1900 Paris Exposition for his Favrile glass. 

Tiffany used this glass in the stained-glass windows designed and made by his studio. His largest and most significant work using Favrile glass is Dream Garden (1916), commissioned by the Curtis Publishing Company for their headquarters in Philadelphia and designed by Maxfield Parrish. It is now owned by the Pennsylvania Academy of the Fine Arts.

History

Tiffany founded his first glassmaking firm in 1892, which he called the Tiffany Glass and Decorating Company. The factory, Tiffany Furnaces, was located in Corona, Queens, New York. It was managed by English immigrant Arthur J. Nash, who was skilled in glassmaking. It was here that Tiffany developed his unique method of glassmaking: treating molten glass with metallic oxides that were absorbed into the glass and created a luxurious iridescent surface effect.

Tiffany worked to develop this new glass after being strongly influenced by his 1865 trip to Europe. In London he visited the South Kensington Museum, later renamed the Victoria and Albert Museum, whose extensive collection of Roman and Syrian glass made a deep impression on him. These included iridescent glass. He also admired the coloration of medieval glass and believed that he could improve on the quality of contemporary glass.

After much experimentation and development, he received the patent for Favrile glass in 1894. He made the first Favrile objects in 1896. At the 1900 Paris Exposition, Tiffany's Favrile glass won the grand prize in the exposition.

Design

Favrile is different from other iridescent glasses because its color is not just on the surface, but part of the glass. The original trade name, Fabrile, was derived from an Old English word, fabrile, meaning "hand-wrought" or handcrafted. Tiffany later changed the word to Favrile, "since this sounded better".

Some of the distinguishing colors in Favrile glass include "Gold Lustre," "Samian Red," "Mazarin Blue," "Tel-el-amarna" (or Turquoise Blue), and "Aquamarine".

Uses
Favrile was the first art glass to be used in stained-glass windows. Tiffany planned to make patterns in windows based on the shapes and color of his glass. Favrile glass also backs a large ornamental clock in Detroit's Guardian Building. The largest and most significant glass-mosaic produced with Favrile glass is likely the Dream Garden (1916), commissioned for the Curtis Publishing Company's headquarters in Philadelphia. Artist Maxfield Parrish designed the work, and Tiffany Studios executed and installed it. The work is now owned by the Pennsylvania Academy of the Fine Arts.

Notes

References

External links

Louis Comfort Tiffany and Laurelton Hall: An Artist's Country Estate, an exhibition catalog from The Metropolitan Museum of Art Libraries (fully available online as PDF), which contains material on favrile glass

Glass art
Glass types
Tiffany Studios